The 1884 Alabama gubernatorial election took place on August 4, 1884, in order to elect the governor of Alabama. Incumbent Democrat Edward A. O'Neal ran unopposed.

Results

References

1884
gubernatorial
Alabama
August 1884 events